= MV ID Integrity =

Ship built in 1996

History
- Name: ID Integrity
- Operator: ID Wallem
- Port of registry: Hong Kong
- Launched: 1996
- Identification: IMO number: 9132923; MMSI number: 477456000; Callsign: VRZA6

General characteristics
- Type: Bulk carrier
- Tonnage: 26,070 tons gross, 45,653 tons dwt
- Length: 186 m (610 ft)
- Beam: 32 m (105 ft)
- Draught: 7.1 m (23 ft)
- Speed: 12.1 knots (22.4 km/h; 13.9 mph) average, 14 knots (26 km/h; 16 mph) maximum

MV ID Integrity is a 26,070 gross ton, 45,653 deadweight ton bulk carrier, built in 1996 and managed by ID Wallem, Hong Kong. The ship was disabled and was in danger of hitting the Great Barrier Reef on 19 May 2012.
